Rubén Sánchez Sáez (born 4 February 2001) is a Spanish professional footballer who plays as a right-back for Espanyol B.

Club career
Born in Barcelona, Catalonia, Sánchez was a youth product of Badalona. He joined the youth academy of Espanyol in 2018. Sánchez signed a professional contract with the club on 21 July 2021, keeping him until 2024. He made his professional debut with Espanyol in a 2–0 La Liga win over Cádiz on 18 October 2021.

References

External links
 
 
 
 RCD Espanyol Profile

2001 births
Living people
Footballers from Barcelona
Spanish footballers
RCD Espanyol footballers
RCD Espanyol B footballers
Association football fullbacks
La Liga players
Primera Federación players
Segunda Federación players